Scalponotatus is a genus of plant bugs in the family Miridae. There are about nine described species in Scalponotatus.

Species
These nine species belong to the genus Scalponotatus.
 Scalponotatus albibasis (Knight, 1938)
 Scalponotatus chillcotti Kelton, 1969
 Scalponotatus dissimulans (Distant, 1893)
 Scalponotatus howdeni Kelton, 1969
 Scalponotatus insignis Kelton, 1969
 Scalponotatus lagunensis Carvalho and Costa, 1992
 Scalponotatus maturus Kelton, 1969
 Scalponotatus mexicanus Kelton, 1969
 Scalponotatus mimosus Kelton, 1969

References

Further reading

 
 
 
 
 
 
 
 

Miridae genera
Orthotylini